As of 2022, nuclear power is provided by six commercial nuclear power plants in Pakistan. Pakistan is the first Muslim majority country in the world to construct and operate civil nuclear power plants. The Pakistan Atomic Energy Commission (PAEC), the scientific and nuclear governmental agency, is solely responsible for operating these power plants. 
As of 2018, the electricity generated by commercial nuclear power plants constitutes roughly 7.5% of electricity generated in Pakistan, Pakistan is not a party to the Nuclear Non-Proliferation Treaty but is a member of the International Atomic Energy Agency. Pakistan plans on constructing 32 nuclear power plants by 2050 and envisions 40,000 MW of nuclear power generation.

History
Professor (and later Nobel laureate) Abdus Salam, as Science Advisor to the President, persuaded President Ayub Khan, to establish Pakistan's first commercial nuclear power reactor, near Karachi. 
Known as Karachi Nuclear Power Plant (KANUPP), the commercial power plant is a small 137 MWe CANDU reactor, a Canadian pressurised heavy water reactor.

PAEC's Parvez Butt, a nuclear engineer, was project-director. The KANUPP began its operations in 1972, and it was inaugurated by President Zulfikar Ali Bhutto and Munir Ahmad Khan as PAEC chairman. 
The KANUPP which is under international safeguards is operated at reduced power. In 1969, France's Commissariat à l'énergie atomique and United Kingdom's British Nuclear Fuels plc (BNFL) contracted with PAEC to provide plutonium and nuclear reprocessing plants in Pakistan. Per the agreement, the PAEC engineers were the lead designers of the power plants and nuclear-reprocessing facilities. While the BNFL and CEA provided the funds, technical assistance, and nuclear materials. The work on projects did not start until 1972, and as a result of India's Operation Smiling Buddha — a surprise nuclear test in 1974 — the BNFL cancelled the projects with PAEC. In 1974, PARR-II Reactor were commissioned, and its project directors were Munir Ahmad Khan and Hafeez Qureshi. The PARR-II is an indigenous reactor that was built under the auspices of PAEC's engineers and scientists.

In 1977, due to pressure exerted by U.S. Secretary of State Henry Kissinger, the CEA cancelled the projects with PAEC immediately. Without the assistance of United Kingdom and France, the PAEC engineers completed the plutonium nuclear reprocessing plant — New Labs — and the plutonium reactor — Khushab Nuclear Complex. Both power plants are commercial power plants control by PAEC. In 1989, People's Republic of China signed an agreement with Pakistan to provide 300 MWe CHASNUPP-I power plant under the IAEA safeguards. In 1990, both France and the Soviet Union considered Pakistan's request to provide the commercial nuclear power plants under the IAEA safeguards. But, after the American Ambassador to Pakistan's Robert Oakley expressed US displeasure at the agreements between the Soviet Union and France, the contracts were cancelled. Pakistan moved towards China for nuclear assistance and signed an agreement on the peaceful usage of commercial nuclear power technology, which help to initiate the cooperation on Chashma reactor with China National Nuclear Corporation in early 1990s. By the 2000, China had expanded its contract with PAEC and is currently assisting in construction of III, and IV power plants. II was completed in April 2011. Due to its growing electricity demands, the Pakistan Government ordered PAEC to set up nuclear power plants in the country. According to PAEC, the goal is to produce 8800 MW electricity by 2030. Prime minister Yousaf Raza Gillani announced the Pakistan national energy policy in 2010 while the feasibility report was submitted in Prime Minister's Secretariat — the official residence of the prime minister of Pakistan. The PAEC is currently planning to lead the construction of the KANUPP-II nuclear power plant — a 1100 MWe power plant — and the KANUPP-III — 1100 MWe. While the commercial plants will be indigenously built, the preliminary work is put on hold as of 2009. In 2010, the Nuclear Power Fuel Complex (PNPFC) — a nuclear reprocessing power plant — was commissioned. PAEC led the construction, designing, and maintenance of the facility, while China and IAEA provided funds to the facility. On 26 November 2013 prime minister Nawaz Sharif performed the groundbreaking ceremony for two nuclear power plants with a combined capacity of 2200 MW near Karachi. Meanwhile, the KANUPP-II nuclear power plant has been connected to national grid. The Prime Minister Imran Khan on inaugurated the Karachi Nuclear Power Plant Unit-2 (K-2) on 21 May 2021. K-2 nuclear power plant runs through G3 technology that has been established with the assistance of China.

International co-operation

China

China has been a strong vocal and avid supporter of Pakistan's nuclear power generation programme from early on. The history of Chinese-Pakistan cooperation dates back to the 1970s when Zulfikar Ali Bhutto, as prime minister, first visited China. The strong academic interaction between Chinese and Pakistan scientists was begun in the 1970s. In 1986, the scientists from KRL and military engineers of the Pakistan Army Corps of Engineers built a HEU enrichment plant in Hanzhong province of PRC, and provided technical assistance to China in weapon-grade centrifuge technology for Chinese nuclear weapons. From the 1980s to the present, China has contracted with Pakistan for the civilian use of nuclear technology.

As of 1990 contract, the second commercial nuclear power plant is CHASNUPP-I in Punjab—a 325 MWe PWR—supplied by China's China National Nuclear Corporation (CNNC) under IAEA safeguards. The main part of the plant was designed by Shanghai Nuclear Engineering Research and Design Institute (SNERDI), based on Qinshan Nuclear Power Plant. The commercial nuclear power plant began its operations May 2000. In 2005, China expanded its contract with Pakistan, and vowed to build more nuclear power plants in Pakistan. Construction of its twin, CHASNUPP-II, started in December 2005. It is reported to cost PkR 51.46 billion (US$860 million, with $350 million of this financed by China). In a meeting with IAEA, an IAEA safeguard agreement with PAEC and IAEA was signed in 2006, and the PM Yousuf Raza Gillani inaugurated 330MW Chashma-2 N-power plant in 2011. The enriched fuel takes place in Pakistan's PNPFC facility, which is also under IAEA safeguards.

In 2005, both Pakistan government and the Chinese government adopted an Energy Security Plan, calling for a huge increase in generating capacity to more than 160,000 MWe by 2030. Pakistan Government plans for lifting nuclear capacity to 8800 MWe, 900 MWe of it by 2015 and a further 1500 MWe by 2020.

Plans included four further Chinese reactors of 300 MWe each and seven of 1000 MWe, all PWR. There were tentative plans for China to build two 1000 MWe PWR units at Karachi as KANUPP II and III, but China then in 2007 deferred development of its CNP-1000 type which is the only one able to be exported. However, Last November 2012, China rolled out its new advanced 1000 MW pressurised water nuclear power reactor, ACPR-1000 at the Hi-Tech Fair in Shenzhen. This reactor was "independently" developed by China Guangdong Nuclear Power Corporation with full IPR and made its debut at the 13th China Hi-Tech Fair, according to the official media. Since this reactor has been developed by China independently without the involvement of foreign suppliers, it is quite likely that China will export this reactor to Pakistan. PAEC is now currently preparing reports and planning to set up small but more commercial nuclear power plants indigenously.

In June 2008, the Pakistan Government announced plans to build commercial nuclear power plants III and IV commercial nuclear power plants at Chashma, Punjab Province, each with 320–340 MWe and costing PKR 129 billion, 80 billion of this from international sources, principally China. A further agreement for China's help with the project was signed in October 2008, and given prominence as a counter to the US–India agreement shortly preceding it. Cost quoted then was US$1.7 billion, with a foreign loan component of $1.07 billion.

In March 2009, SNERDI announced that it was proceeding with design of CHASNUPP-III and IV, with China Zhongyuan Engineering as the general contractor. The PAEC said Beijing was financing 85% of the US$1.6 billion project. Contracts for CHASNUPP-I and II were signed in 1990 and 2000, before 2004 when China joined the Nuclear Suppliers Group (NSG), which maintains an embargo on sales of nuclear equipment to Pakistan, but there are questions about China's supply of Chasma-3 and 4. On 24 September 2010, China informed the IAEA that it will implement an agreement with Pakistan on the export of two nuclear reactors for Islamabad's Chashma nuclear complex. Beijing has said that the reactor deal is part of a 2003 agreement between the two countries, a claim many have questioned, though Germany has accepted. These will be the third and fourth reactors at the complex. According to the Chinese communication to the IAEA, the reactors will be placed under international safeguards. Concerns have been expressed over the lack the safety features incorporated into the Chashma-3 and Chashma-4 reactors, which are alleged to use a design which is not considered safe enough to build in China.

In March 2013, Pakistan and China agreed to build a 1000 MW CHASNUPP-5 at Chashma Nuclear Power Complex.
In July 2013, it was announced that Pakistani officials were considering approval of KANUPP-2, a 1,000 megawatt reactor to be built with assistance from China. According to PAEC, CNPS hosts four nuclear power plants based on Chinese Pressurized Water Reactor (PWR) technology. CNPGS Unit 1 (C-1) and Unit-2 (C-2) have a gross capacity of 325 MW each. C-1 started operation in 2000, while C-2 in 2011. CNPGS Unit 3 (C-3) and Unit-4 (C-4) both with gross capacity of 340 MW each started commercial operation in 2016 & 2017, respectively. All four nuclear plants at Chashma are under IAEA safeguards.

France
In May 2009, France agreed to cooperate with Pakistan on nuclear safety, which Pakistan's Foreign Minister called a 'significant development' related to the transfer of civilian nuclear technology to Pakistan. But later a spokesman for the French presidency was careful to rein in expectations, saying Mr Sarkozy had "confirmed France was ready, within the framework of its international agreements, to co-operate with Pakistan in the field of nuclear safety." In October 2013, French Ambassador Philippe Thiebaud said "my country is ready to consider the request for enhancing civil nuclear cooperation in line with international obligations."

United States
In a U.S.–Pakistan strategic dialogue on 24 March 2010, Pakistan pressed for a civil nuclear cooperation deal similar to that with India. One analyst suggested that such a deal was unrealistic at present but might be possible in 10–15 years.

Japan

In 2011, Dr. Irfan Yusuf Shami, the Director-General (Disarmament) of the Ministry of Foreign Affairs of Pakistan and Makyo Maya Gawa, the Director-General of Disarmament and Non-Proliferation Department of the Japanese Ministry of Foreign Affairs signed an agreement for nuclear non-proliferation in Tokyo. Both countries agreed on maintaining stability in South Asia.

In 2011, during the state visit of President Asif Zardari, Pakistan sought civil nuclear power cooperation with Japan, similar to a previous deal between Japan and India. According to the Jang News group, the Japanese government refused the deal with Pakistan. According to the Pakistan Media, the Pakistan officials were highly disappointed with Japanese denial. On the other hand, Japanese officials were left disappointed as Pakistan had denied the Japanese request to support Japan's candidacy for permanent seat for the United Nations Security Council.

Nuclear power plants

Fuel cycle
The government has set a target of producing 350 tonnes (U3O8)per year from 2015 to meet one third of anticipated requirements then. Low grade ore is known in central Punjab Province at Bannu Basin and Sulaiman Mountains.

A small (15,000 SWU/yr) uranium centrifuge enrichment plant at Kahuta has been operated by the KRL since 1984 and does not have any apparent civil use. It was expanded threefold about 1991. A newer plant is reported to be at Gadwal which is operated by PAEC. The plant is not under safeguards of IAEA.

In 2006, the PAEC announced that it was preparing to set up separate and purely civil conversion, enrichment and fuel fabrication plants as a new US$1.2 billion Nuclear Power Fuel Complex which would be under IAEA safeguards and managed separately from existing facilities. At least the enrichment plant would be built at Chak Jhumra, Faisalabad, in the Punjab and have a 150,000 SWU/yr capacity in five years — about 2013, then be expanded in 150,000 SWU increments to be able to supply one third of the enrichment requirements for a planned 8800 MWe generating capacity by 2030.

Nuclear reprocessing

The country also has operated one indigenous reprocessing plant, built by PAEC, which was known as the New Labs — outside PINSTECH, Nilore, near Islamabad. The PAEC had contracted with British BNFL for a reprocessing facility which was cancelled in 1974. It was built under the leadership of Mr. Munir Ahmad Khan The plant became functional in the early 1980s, and it is not under IAEA inspection. The second nuclear reprocessing plant was also started by PAEC under Munir Ahmad Khan, in 1976, at Chashma, under a contract agreement with France However, France cancelled the agreement for the said plant under US influence in August 1978 . In 2006, the PAEC started work another nuclear fuel fabrication plant — Pakistan Nuclear Power Fuel Complex — located 175 kilometers south near Islamabad. An indigenous Nuclear Fuel Fabrication Complex at Kundian, known as Kundian Nuclear Fuel Complex (KNFC), already exists which was built by PAEC under Munir Ahmad Khan and completed by 1980. Kundian Nuclear Fuel Complex makes nuclear fuel for KANUPP. However, the 2006 PNPFC project is being financed by the joint Sino-Pak Nuclear Technology Consortium, and the PAEC is leading the designing and construction of the plant. It will be under safeguards but KNFC is not under safeguards. The Pakistan Nuclear Power Fuel Complex is under the IAEA safeguards and inspections as the IAEA also contributed in the mega project financially.

Radioactive waste management
The Pakistan Atomic Energy Commission (PAEC) is responsible for the radioactive waste management. From 1972, the PAEC has undertaken to establish the safety objectives, management, and radioactive waste management. 
In 2004, the PNRA issued guidelines for the management of nuclear and radioactive waste in nuclear and medical research centers under PAEC. 
In 2010, the PNRA issued regulatory policy on radioactive waste materials, and Pakistan lawmakers presented the regulatory policy in Pakistan Parliament. The parliament passed the PNRA regulatory policy unanimously, making it into laws.

The PNRA proposed new Waste Management offices to control of the radiation and radioactive materials. The Waste Management Centres are proposed for Karachi, Rawalpindi, Nilore, Lahore and Chashma. Used fuel is currently stored at each reactor in pools. Longer-term dry storage at each site is proposed. The question of future reprocessing remains open. A National Repository for low- and intermediate-level wastes is due to be commissioned by 2015.

Radiation control

The PAEC's directorate for Nuclear Safety and Radiation Control (NSRC) was responsible for the radiation and high radioactive material control in the country. However, in 2001, with the establishment of the Pakistan Nuclear Regulatory Authority (PNRA), the responsibilities were shifted to PNRA. In 2003, the responsibilities and agency's goals were expanded, as PNRA were given the status of an executive agency. The PNRA oversees reactor safety and security, reactor licensing and renewal, radioactive material safety, security and licensing, and spent fuel management (storage, security, recycling, and disposal). The PNRA closely works with the Chinese CNNC, and is frequently visited by Chinese staff as its technical advisers.

Industry and academic

The Pakistan Nuclear Society (PNS) is a scientific and educational society that has both industry and academic members. The organisation publishes large amount of scientific literature on nuclear technology on several journals. The PNS also allied itself with American Nuclear Society (ANS), European Nuclear Society (ENS), Indian Nuclear Society (INS), Korean Nuclear Society (KNS), Chinese Nuclear Society (CNS), Hungarian Nuclear Society (HNS), and the Spanish Nuclear Society (SNS). 
The Pakistan Atomic Energy Commission also published large sums of publication, and published a quarterly magazine — The Nucleus. The PAEC's academic scientists and engineers also publishes the newsletter — The PakAtom — concerning on nuclear technology and lobbying for the commercial nuclear power plants.

Nuclear Power Programme 2050 

The Nuclear Power Programme 2050 is the official nuclear energy policy of the Government of Pakistan to make usage of nuclear power to meet the existing electricity crises and to respond to the future requirements of a growing population and national economy. The program is envisaged to increase energy production from nuclear sources by the year of 2050. As part of the energy security strategy, the enactment of the program is aim to expand the self-sustaining nuclear power infrastructure all over the country by year 2050. It came in a strong response to U.S-India nuclear deal, as well as to counter the existing energy shortfalls and future requirements of a growing population and national economy. The primary focus of this program is to promote scientific and socio-economic development of the people as a "foremost priority."

The policy was first stated by the former Prime minister Yousaf Raza Gillani during the meeting of Nuclear Command Authority; at this meeting, the program was approved by Prime minister Gillani on 14 July 2011.  This includes to regulate the nuclear facilities, waste storage, along with an increase in power plant building. Both legislative, military and bureaucratic regulations of nuclear energy in Pakistan have been shaped by the scientific research and the public opinion. The governmental nuclear regulatory authorities in Pakistan has projected to produce 4345 MW electricity from nuclear sources in 2022; and 8800 MW electricity by 2030.

Academic research

The academic research on nuclear technology began in 1956, with the establishment of Pakistan Atomic Energy Commission. In 1965, United States provided a 10 MW research reactor – Pakistan Atomic Research Reactor-I (PARR) – to Pakistan. The PARR-Reactor consists of three research reactors with a single nuclear particle accelerator. The first reactor was supplied by the U.S. government in 1965 and it is operated by the Pakistan Institute of Nuclear Science and Technology (PINSTECH). In 1969, the Center for Nuclear Studies was established, and it began its research in a small reactor that was provided by the PAEC. In 1989, the PAEC had built another small research reactor, known as Pakistan Atomic Research Reactor-II reactor. The PARR-II reactor is an indigenously built reactor by the PAEC, and is under IAEA safeguards since IAEA had funded this mega-project.

In 1986, another "multipurpose" heavy water reactor, a 50 MWe pressurised heavy water reactor (PHWR) near Khushab, was built. Known as Khushab-I, it went critical and started its operations in April 1998. The complex is evidently for producing weapons-grade plutonium, isotope production and nuclear reprocessing. A similar or possibly larger heavy water reactor has been under construction at Khushab since about 2002. Khushab is reported to be making demands upon the country's limited uranium resources. Reprocessing of weapon-grade material is reported to take place at Chashma Nuclear Complex, 80 km west.

See also
 Nuclear power
 Nuclear power by country
 Pakistan and weapons of mass destruction

References

Further reading
 
 Nuclear Power for Pakistan: Reviving the 3Es (Energy, Economy, and Environment), by Abdul Rehman Abbasi and Anwar ul Hasson Syed, in Proc. ICESE-2010.

External links
 World Nuclear Organisation
 Bringing Pakistan In From the Cold